Blanky may refer to:
A blanket
A  security blanket, often spelled blankie in this context
Blanky, the expletive "bloody"(euphemistically)
The Blanky group, an Algerian corporation

Art, entertainment, and media
Blanky, the electric blanket character in the novel and film The Brave Little Toaster
Thomas Blanky, a real-life ice master on HMS Terror and a character in Dan Simmons' historical novel, The Terror (2007)